The western Balkan barbel (Barbus rebeli) is a species of ray-finned fish in the  family Cyprinidae. It is found from  the Drin to the Vjosa River.

References 

Barbus
Cyprinid fish of Europe
Fish described in 1926